John W. Barrett is professor of mathematical physics at the University of Nottingham. He is a quantum gravity researcher who is known for the Barrett–Crane model of quantum gravity.

References

Living people
Scientists from London
Academics of the University of Nottingham
Year of birth missing (living people)